Berdan Dam is an embankment dam on the Berdan River in Mersin Province, Turkey. It was built between 1975 and 1984.

See also

List of dams and reservoirs in Turkey

External links
DSI

Dams in Mersin Province
Hydroelectric power stations in Turkey
Dams completed in 1984